Leif Larsson (9 August 1928 – 11 February 2002) was a Swedish sports shooter. He competed at the 1960, 1964 and Shooting at the 1968 Summer Olympics.

References

1928 births
2002 deaths
Swedish male sport shooters
Olympic shooters of Sweden
Shooters at the 1960 Summer Olympics
Shooters at the 1964 Summer Olympics
Shooters at the 1968 Summer Olympics
Sportspeople from Gothenburg
20th-century Swedish people